The Makerua Swamp (also known as the Opiki Plains) is an area of  the Opiki District of the Manawatū-Whanganui region of New Zealand. In the early 20th century it was the location of flax mills that operated on the banks of the Manawatū River. Flax fibre from New Zealand flax or harekeke, was an important produce of New Zealand.

Drainage 
Makerua was one of the areas the government gave to the Wellington and Manawatu Railway Company to finance construction of the line. Work to drain the swamp began in 1884, with felling of bush along the banks of the Tokomaru River. A drainage board was formed in 1906. By 1924  of stopbanks had been formed along the Manawatū River and  each along the Mangaone and Tokomaru. After closure of the flax mills, more drainage was done to convert the land for farming. The Makerua Swamp Wildlife Management Reserve was set up in 1986 to conserve wildlife in a  area.

Mills 
The Miranui flax mill near Shannon was owned by the Seifert brothers. Miranui (Māori for Big Mill) operated from 1907 to 1933, and was the largest in the district. At its peak it had seven stripping machines and 300 employees. Miranui had much better labour relations than the other mills.

Transportation 

It purchased in 1907 a 5-ton steam locomotive from Bagnall and Co in England to haul the bespoke flax wagons. However, even this lightweight engine proved too heavy for the flimsy tracks across the swamps and it was sold to work later on the Piha Tramway on the West Coast near Auckland and near Raetihi in the central North Island. Horse-drawn narrow gauge railways on temporary tracks for harvesting the hemp on the fields were used from 1910 onwards.

As Makerua railway station was nearby, it was possible to transport the bales of flax via the North Island Main Trunk railway to seaports, from where they could be exported overseas.

References

Further reading
 Bob Ayson: Miranui - The Story of New Zealand's Largest Flax Mill. Published in 1977. Retrieved on 6 May 2018.

Manawatu District
Landforms of Manawatū-Whanganui